He Qi (born 24 August 1973) is a Chinese former volleyball player who competed in the 1996 Summer Olympics and in the 2000 Summer Olympics. She is from Yunnan.

References

1973 births
Living people
Chinese women's volleyball players
Olympic volleyball players of China
Volleyball players at the 1996 Summer Olympics
Volleyball players at the 2000 Summer Olympics
Olympic silver medalists for China
Olympic medalists in volleyball
Asian Games medalists in volleyball
Volleyball players at the 1998 Asian Games
Volleyball players from Shanghai
Medalists at the 1996 Summer Olympics
Medalists at the 1998 Asian Games
Asian Games gold medalists for China
Sportspeople from Yunnan
20th-century Chinese women